Saif is an Arabic name that means sword or scimitar. also, it means the protector of something''.

Saif , SAIF, or Seif may also refer to:

Military
Arab sword, an Arabian sword of pre-Islamic origin
Scimitar, a curved sword associated with Middle Eastern, South Asian, or North African cultures

Science and technology
 HL7 Services Aware Interoperability Framework
 Seif dune, a type of sand dune
 Spatial Archive and Interchange Format

Organizations 
 Shanghai Advanced Institute of Finance
 Social Enterprise Investment Fund
 State Accident Insurance Fund

Given name
 Saif Ali Khan, Bollywood actor
 Saif al-Adel, Egyptian al-Qaeda member
 Saif al-Islam Gaddafi, son of former Libyan politician Muammar Gadaffi
 Saif al-Arab Gaddafi, son of former Libyan politician Muammar Gadaffi
 Saif Saaeed Shaheen (born 1982), steeplechase runner
 Saif bin Zayed Al Nahyan, a politician from the United Arab Emirates
 Saif bin Sultan, Imam of the Ibadi sect in Oman
 Saïf Ghezal, Tunisian Footballer
 Saif Ahmad, Bangladeshi-American restaurateur and World Series of Poker champion
 Saif Ahmad Al Ghurair, Dubai CEO

Surname
 Abdulla Hassan Saif, Bahraini banker and politician
 Detlef Seif (born 1962), German politician
 Faisal Saif, Indian film director and writer
 Mostafa Elwi Saif, Egyptian politician
 Umar Saif, Pakistani computer scientist
 Valiollah Seif, Iranian banker and economist

Other uses
 Saif, Iran (disambiguation)
 Omar Sa'if Center, a Taliban center on the outskirts of Kabul
 Saif, a character in the web series Corner Shop Show
 Arab sword, also known as a Saif (سيف‎)

See also
 Saiph or Kappa Orionis, a star in the constellation Orion

Arabic-language surnames
Arabic masculine given names